Pop City was a weekly online magazine whose content focused on news and features about Pittsburgh, Pennsylvania.  The content focused on talent, innovation, diversity, and environment. The magazine was published between 2006 and 2015.

History
Pop City was launched in March 2006 on a budget of $200,000. The costs were defrayed by pledges from the Urban Redevelopment Authority, The Pittsburgh Cultural Trust, and the Allegheny Conference on Community Development.

The publication held 39,000 subscribers and a team of two dozen stringers. Though Eve Picker was the first publisher, Tracy Certo ran the publication for eight years. She would later found the spiritual successor NEXTPittsburgh.

References

2006 establishments in Pennsylvania
2015 disestablishments in Pennsylvania
Local interest magazines published in the United States
Online magazines published in the United States
Weekly magazines published in the United States
Defunct magazines published in the United States
Magazines established in 2006
Magazines disestablished in 2015
Magazines published in Pittsburgh